The 2013–14 South Alabama Jaguars basketball team represented the University of South Alabama during the 2013–14 NCAA Division I men's basketball season. The Jaguars, led by first year head coach Matthew Graves, played their home games at the Mitchell Center and were members of the Sun Belt Conference. They finished the season 11–20, 5–13 in Sun Belt play to finish in ninth place. They failed to qualify for the Sun Belt Conference tournament.

Roster

Schedule

|-
!colspan=9 style="background:#000066; color:#ff0000;"| Exhibition

|-
!colspan=9 style="background:#000066; color:#ff0000;"| Regular season

References

South Alabama Jaguars men's basketball seasons
South Alabama
2013 in sports in Alabama
2014 in sports in Alabama